Batinjani may refer to:

Batinjani, Bjelovar-Bilogora County, village in the Đulovac municipality, population 273 (as of 2001)
Batinjani, Požega-Slavonia County, settlement near Pakrac, population 90 (as of 2001)